Super Dzvezda is a children's festival in Skopje, Republic of North Macedonia. The first Super Dzvezda festival was held in 1998. The authors of the children's hits include established Macedonian performers, i.e. Kaliopi, Jovan Jovanov and Elvir Mekić.

References

External links
Official web site

Music festivals in North Macedonia
Children's music festivals
Festivals in Skopje
1998 establishments in the Republic of Macedonia
Children's festivals in North Macedonia